Nick Walker or Nicholas Walker may refer to:

 Nick Walker (cricketer) (born 1984), British cricketer
 Nick Walker (artist) (born 1969), British graffiti artist
 Nick Walker (snooker player) (born 1973), English former snooker player
 Nick Walker (footballer) (born 1990), Trinidadian footballer
 Nicholas Walker (actor), known for his roles on the American soap operas Capitol and One Life to Live
 Nico Walker, birth name Nicholas Walker, American writer and bank robber